Federico Groppioni (born 17 June 1984 in Rome) is an Italian professional football player who is currently playing for Csep-Gól FC.

External links
 
 HLSZ 

1984 births
Living people
Footballers from Rome
Italian footballers
Association football goalkeepers
Atletico Roma F.C. players
A.S. Gubbio 1910 players
Potenza S.C. players
Manfredonia Calcio players
MTK Budapest FC players
Nemzeti Bajnokság I players
Italian expatriate footballers
Expatriate footballers in Hungary
Italian expatriate sportspeople in Hungary
Lupa Roma F.C. players